Uttar Dakshin is a 1987 Hindi-language action drama film produced by Ashok Khanna and Subhash Ghai, directed by Prabhat Khanna and featuring Rajinikanth, Jackie Shroff, Madhuri Dixit and Bharathi in the lead roles. Laxmikant Pyarelal have composed the music, while Anand Bakshi has written the lyrics for the film. It was dubbed in Tamil as Chella Pillai.

Plot
At the time of his mother's death, Raja learns that his father is still alive and living a wealthy life. Raja now befriends Shankran, his step-brother and steals his girlfriend Chanda. He also fraudulently takes signatures of Shankran on certain property papers. However, Shankran's mother is a very intelligent lady and catches Raja red-handed. However, she does not hand him over to the police when she learns that he is her step-son. Meanwhile, Shankran is unable to handle Chanda's rejection and is in grief. However, he too excuses Raja after he learns that he is his step-brother. Meanwhile, their father Krishnakant returns from abroad and when he becomes aware of this, he is very upset. He is about to take action against Raja but excuses him after he learns that he is his elder son.

Cast
Rajinikanth as Shankar
Jackie Shroff as Raja
Madhuri Dixit as Chanda
Bharathi as Bharathi
Kulbhushan Kharbanda as Krishna Kant
Seema Deo as Sharda
Lalita Pawar as Raja's grandmother
Anupam Kher as Ramniklal
Paresh Rawal as Varda Rai
Preeti Ganguli
Beena Banerjee as Anju
Vinod Kapoor as Anju's husband (special appearance)
Bob Christo as Bob
Satish Kaushik as Kashiram
Anjana Mumtaz as Ram Pyari
Sudhir as Rasiklal

Soundtrack

References

External links

1987 films
1980s Hindi-language films
Films scored by Laxmikant–Pyarelal